54 Mount Street is a grade II* listed building in Mount Street in the City of Westminster. It is the residence of the Brazilian ambassador in London. The main embassy building is located at Cockspur Street.

It was built in 1896–97 to a design by Fairfax Blomfield Wade-Palmer for Lord Windsor, later the Earl of Plymouth. Historic England describe it as using "Arts and Crafts quality of materials and detailing combined with innovatory Free "renaissance" and hints of Grand Siècle classicism, with sumptuous formal interiors."

Gallery
Images of the interior, c. 1911.

References

External links 

Mount Street, London
Grade II* listed houses in London
Grade II* listed buildings in the City of Westminster
Arts and Crafts architecture in London
Buildings and structures completed in 1896